Ondřej Ládek (born 16 August 1979), known professionally as Xindl X, is a Czech singer-songwriter and screenwriter. In his music he combines pop, folk, hip hop, jazz and blues.

Life and career
With Julius Ševčík  he wrote the screenplay for the Ševčík`s film Restart released in 2005, he is the screenwriter of 16 episodes of Comeback TV series as well.

His debut album Návod ke čtení manuálu, released in 2008, was nominated for Anděl Award 2008 in Best folk & country album category. The first single from album, song Anděl, was nominated for Anděl Award 2009 in Composition of the Year and Video of the Year categories.

Song Láska v housce, a duet with Olga Lounová from his second album Praxe relativity, was nominated for Anděl Award 2010 in Composition of the Year and Video of the Year categories, Xindl X himself was nominated in Male singer of the Year category.

Song V blbým věku from his fourth album Čecháček Made, was nominated for Anděl Award 2014 in Composition of the Year and Video of the Year categories.

After the release of his fifth album Kvadratura záchranného kruhu he was nominated for Anděl Award 2016 in Male singer of the Year category.

Albums 
 2008 – 
 2010 – 
 2011 –  (compilation album)
 2012 – 
 2014 – 
 2016 – 
 2018 – Sexy Exity
 2021 - Terapie

Singles 
 2008 – "Anděl" 
 2008 – "Dysgrafik"
 2010 – "Láska v housce" (feat Olga Lounová)
 2010 – "Láska v housce2 (feat Olga Lounová)
 2011 – "Řiditel autobusu" (feat , Vojtěch Dyk a Dan Bárta)
 2012 – "Stědrej večer nastal"
 2012 – "Casio"
 2014 – "V blbým věku" 
 2014 – "Milý Ježíšku (Xindloviny na Radiu CityX)"
 2014 – "Zeman (Xindloviny na Radiu CityX)"
 2015 – "Cudzinka v tvojej zemi" (feat Mirka Miškechová)
 2016 – "Na vodě"
 2016 – "Popelka"
 2017 – "Mýval"
 2018 – "Věčně nevěrná feat Sabina Křováková"
 2018 – "Byznys"
 2018 – "Dřevo"
 2018 – "Xindl X – ZZZ (pro Světlušku)" (feat Jananas)
 2019 – "Alenka"
 2020 – "Růžový brejle"
 2021 – "Má chata, můj hrad"
 2021 – "Lovec perel"

References

External links 

 
 

1979 births
Czech composers
Czech guitarists
Male guitarists
Czech screenwriters
21st-century Czech male singers
Living people
Czech folk singers
Musicians from Prague
Folk-pop singers
21st-century guitarists
21st-century screenwriters
Male screenwriters
21st-century male writers
Male television writers
Television writers
Writers from Prague